Adriana Lara López is a Mexican computer scientist whose research involves evolutionary computation, memetic algorithms, and multi-objective optimization. She is a professor in the school of physics and mathematics at the Instituto Politécnico Nacional in Mexico.

Education and career
Lara graduated from the Instituto Politécnico Nacional in 2001, and earned a master's degree through CINVESTAV in 2003. She completed her PhD at CINVESTAV in 2012. Her dissertation, Using Gradient Based Information to Build Hybrid Multi-objective Evolutionary Algorithms, was jointly supervised by Oliver Schütze and Carlos A. Coello Coello.

She has been a professor at the IPN since 2003.

Recognition
Lara was elected to the Mexican Academy of Sciences in 2022.

References

External links

Year of birth missing (living people)
Living people
Mexican computer scientists
Women computer scientists
Academic staff of the Instituto Politécnico Nacional
Members of the Mexican Academy of Sciences